Gareth Phillips is a Welsh former actor, best known for playing Nick Williams in the long-running BBC school drama, Grange Hill. He appeared from 1991–1993.

Gareth currently lives in Brecon, Powys, Wales, running a pub called "The Gremlin". He also teaches drama and occasionally appears on stage locally.

He entered the "Mr Wales" competition in 1998 and achieved 3rd position.

References

20th-century Welsh male actors
Place of birth missing (living people)
Year of birth missing (living people)
Living people
Welsh male television actors